The 1979 Men's Stellar World Team Amateur Squash Championships were held in Brisbane in Australia and took place from October 17 to October 28, 1979. This was the last World Amateur Championship before the game went open.

Results

Pool A

Pool B

Semi-finals

Third Place Play Off

Final

See also 
World Team Squash Championships
World Squash Federation
World Open (squash)

References 

World Squash Championships
Squash tournaments in Australia
International sports competitions hosted by Australia
Squash
Men